A number of world records and Olympic records were set in various events at the 2000 Summer Olympics in Sydney.

Records by sport

Cycling

Sources

References

2000 Summer Olympics
2000 Summer Olympics